The 2021 Edmonton municipal election was held on October 18, 2021, to elect a mayor and 12 councillors to the city council, the nine trustees to Edmonton Public Schools, and the seven trustees to the Edmonton Catholic Schools. It was held in conjunction with the 2021 Alberta municipal elections.

In conjunction with the municipal elections, residents voted in a provincially mandated Senate nominee election, a referendum on equalization and on whether to adopt permanent daylight saving time.

Incumbent mayor Don Iveson announced in November 2020 that he would not be seeking re-election.

Mayor and councillors were elected through First-past-the-post voting in single-member wards.

Candidates 
X = incumbent.
Candidates as listed have filed the necessary paperwork with the City of Edmonton.

Mayor

Abdul Malik Chukwudi - engineer
Rick Comrie - business owner
Brian (Breezy) Gregg - retired music artist
Kim Krushell - former councillor
Augustine Marah - teacher and community activist
Mike Nickel - incumbent ward 11 councillor
Michael Oshry - former councillor
Amarjeet Sohi - former councillor and MP
Diana Steele - President of Crestwood Community League
Cheryll Watson - Former Head of Innovate Edmonton

Council
The following is a list of candidates that announced their candidacy for the 2021 election. Edmonton's ward map was redrawn for the 2021 election, with each ward being given an Indigenous name.

Each ward elected one councillor through First-past-the-post voting.

The total number of candidates for council seats was larger than in any previous election in Edmonton history, even beating the record set in the 1964 Edmonton municipal election.

Nakota Isga
(Rosenthal, West Jasper Place, Big Lake, Westview Village, Lewis Farms, Glenora)

Andrew Knack - incumbent
Dave Olivier - businessman
Steve Weston - construction manager

Anirniq
(Calder, the Pallisades, Griesbach, Athlone, Wellington, Lauderdale, Rosslyn, Kensington, Carlisle, Cumberland, Sherbrooke, Inglewood, Woodcroft, Dovercourt, Prince Charles, Albany)

Mark Davies - risk management director
Bev Esslinger - incumbent
Ali Haymour - finished third in the 2017 Ward 2 race
Erin Rutherford - public sector manager
Tyler Zutz - business consultant

tastawiyiniwak 
(Castle Downs, Dickinsfield, Londonderry, Lake District)

Ahmed "Knowmadic" Ali - poet
Cody Bondarchuk - community leader
Jon Dziadyk - incumbent
Iannie Gerona - shopkeeper
Zain Hafiz - business owner
Karen Principe - finished third in the 2017 Ward 3 race

Dene
(Casselman-Steele Heights, Clareview, Hermitage, Horse Hill, Pilot Sound)

Gerard Mutabazi Amani - community leader
Andy Andrzej Gudanowski - finished sixth in the 2017 Ward 7 race
Aaron Paquette - incumbent
Lana Palmer - oral surgeon
Tricia Velthuizen - spokesperson for Service Alberta Minister Nate Glubish, finished fourth in the 2017 Ward 4 race

O-day’min
(Riverview Area, Edgemont, Stillwater, Uplands, River's Edge, Glastonbury, Granville, Hamptons, Lymnurn, Ormsby Place, Dechene, Downtown, Callingwood North/South, Elmwood, Lynnwood, Patricia Heights, Quesnell, Oleskiew, Thorncliff, Westringe, Cameron, Jamieson Place, Wedgewood, Donsdale, Gariepy, Lessard North)

Gino Akbari - entrepreneur
Gabrielle Battiste - lawyer
Adrian Bruff - entrepreneur
Tony Caterina - incumbent
Naima Haile - curator
Mohammed Migdaddy - clinical pharmacist
Adil Pirbhai - finished fourth in the 2017 Ward 6 race
Anne Stevenson - urban planner
Ibrahim Wado
Joshua Wolchansky - civil servant

Métis
(Abbottsfield, Alberta Avenue, Avonmore, Beacon Heights, Bellevue, Bergman, Beverly Heights, Bonnie Doon, Capilano, Cloverdale, Cromdale, Delton, Eastwood, Elmwood Park, Forest Heights, Fulton Place, Gold Bar, Highlands, Holyrood, Idylwylde, Kenilworth, King Edward Park, Montrose, Newton, Ottewell, Parkdale, Rundle Heights, Strathearn, Terrace Heights, Virginia Park)

Rob Bernshaw - finished third in the 2013 Ward 3 race
Abdulhakim Dalel - political activist
Liz John-West - finished fourth in the 2017 Ward 7 race
Brian Kendrick - finished third in the 2010 Ward 5 race
Daniel John Kornak - political activist
James Kosowan - finished third in the 2017 Ward 8 race
Cori Longo - postal worker
Caroline Matthews - entrepreneur
Salar Melli - entrepreneur
Jim Rickett - Telus operations manager
Ashley Salvador - entrepreneur
Steven Townsend - entrepreneur

sipiwiyiniwak
(The Grange, Riverview, Cameron Heights, Laurier Heights, Edgemont)

Giselle General - public servant
Sarah Hamilton - incumbent
Scott Hayes - realtor
Daniel Heikkinen - entrepreneur
Derek Hlady - entrepreneur

papastew
(Belgravia, Strathcona, Ritchie, Grandview, Allendale, Pleasantview, Aspen Gardens, Greenfield, Duggan)

Haruun Ali - university student
James Cameron - businessman
Susan Field - businesswoman
Kirsten Goa - finished second in the 2017 Ward 8 race
Michael Janz - former public school trustee of Ward F
Tarcy Schindelka - businessman
Byron Vass - environmental sector

pihêsiwin 
(Riverbend, Terwillegar Heights, Windermere, Magrath Heights, Mactaggart)

Guiscela Perez Arellano - IT
Tim Cartmell - incumbent

Ipiihkoohkanipiaohtsi
(Kaskitayo:Blue Quill, Ermineskin, Keheewin, Twinbrooks; Heritage Valley:Blackburne, Rutherford, Graydon Hill, Chappelle, Allard)

Jason Carter - Indigenous artist
Rhiannon Hoyle - entrepreneur
Scott Johnston - radio reporter
Glynnis Andrea Lieb - social psychologist
Jon Morgan - community leader
Jennifer Rice - public servant

Karhiio
(Ellerslie, Knottwood, Lakewood, Mill Woods Town Centre, Millbourne, Millhurst, Woodvale, Summerside, Southeast Edmonton)

Muhammad Herman Gill - businessman
Sana Kakar - architect
Charan Saggu - businessman
Tom Shaw - project manager
Keren Tang - finished second in the 2017 Ward 11 race
Shamair Turner - insurance broker

Sspomitapi
(Decoteau, The Meadows, Burnewood, Ridgewood, Southwood, Maple Ridge)

Moe Banga - incumbent
Jasbir Singh Gill - President of Edmonton Taxi Association
Harman Singh Kandola - lawyer
Mukesh Makwana - welder
Sanjay Malhotra - businessman
Rashpal Sehmby - postal worker
Jo-Anne Wright - finished second in the 2013 Ward 12 race

Edmonton Public School Board Trustees

Edmonton Catholic School Board Trustees

Mayoral opinion polling

See also 
2021 Alberta municipal elections
2021 Calgary municipal election
2021 Lethbridge municipal election

Footnotes

References 

Municipal elections in Edmonton
2021 Alberta municipal elections